Anguilla competed at the 2018 Commonwealth Games in the Gold Coast, Australia from April 4 to April 15, 2018.  It was Anguilla's 6th appearance at the Commonwealth Games.

The Anguillan team consisted of 12 athletes competed in three sports: athletics, boxing and road cycling. The Anguillan team also consisted of seven officials. The appearance in boxing marked the Commonwealth Games debut for the country in the sport.

Competitors
The following is the list of number of competitors participating at the Games per sport/discipline.

Athletics (track and field)

Anguilla's track and field team consisted of five athletes (two male and three female).

Track & road events

Boxing

Anguilla's boxing team consisted of two male athletes. The appearance in boxing marked the Commonwealth Games debut for the country in the sport.

Men

Cycling

Anguilla's cycling team consisted of five male athletes.

Road
Men

References

Nations at the 2018 Commonwealth Games
Anguilla at the Commonwealth Games
2018 in Anguilla